Alfred Emmott, 1st Baron Emmott,  (8 May 1858 – 13 December 1926) was a British businessman and Liberal Party politician.

Background and education
The eldest surviving son of Thomas Emmott, of Brookfield, Oldham, he was educated at Grove House, Tottenham, and at the University of London. He became a partner in Emmott and Walshall, cotton spinners, of Oldham.

Political career
In 1881, Emmott entered the Oldham Municipal Borough Council and was mayor of the town between 1891 and 1892. In a by-election in 1899 he was elected Liberal Member of Parliament for Oldham, a seat he held until 1911. It was a two-member seat, and Winston Churchill, who started his political career there, was the other member from 1900 to 1906. 

Emmott served as Chairman of Ways and Means (Deputy Speaker of the House of Commons) from 1906 to 1911 and was sworn of the Privy Council in 1908. In October 1911 he was appointed Under-Secretary of State for the Colonies by H. H. Asquith and the following month he was raised to the peerage as Baron Emmott, of Oldham in the County Palatine of Lancaster. He remained at the Colonial Office until 1914 and was then a member of Asquith's cabinet as First Commissioner of Works between 1914 and 1915.

Emmott was also Director of the War Trade Department between 1915 and 1919, chaired the Royal Commission on Decimal Coinage between 1918 and 1920 and was President of the Royal Statistical Society between 1922 and 1924. He was a churchman, but his education at the Friends' School and his ancestry led him to sympathize with nonconformists. He was appointed a GCMG in 1914 and a GBE in 1917.

In his approach to politics, Emmott was a strong supporter of the government's social reforms. This was arguably reflected in 1910 when Emmott, in response to Conservative critics who attacked the Liberals as "socialistic", retorted that "so far as we have gone in the direction of Socialism, so-called, whether it be in regard to free and compulsory education, whether it be in regard to old age pensions, or in respect of any other reform, we have not diminished, but rather added to the liberty of the individual."

Family
Lord Emmott married Mary Gertrude, a daughter of J. W. Lees, in 1887, and they had two daughters. Lady Emmott was a Justice of the Peace for London. In February 1926, aged 67, Lord Emmott died very suddenly, from angina pectoris, at his home in London, on a day when he was engaged to speak at a Liberal Party rally. The barony became extinct on his death, as he had no son.

Arms

References

External links 

 

1858 births
1926 deaths
Barons in the Peerage of the United Kingdom
Members of the Privy Council of the United Kingdom
Knights Grand Cross of the Order of St Michael and St George
Knights Grand Cross of the Order of the British Empire
Alumni of the University of London
Liberal Party (UK) MPs for English constituencies
Presidents of the Royal Statistical Society
UK MPs 1895–1900
UK MPs 1900–1906
UK MPs 1906–1910
UK MPs 1910
UK MPs 1910–1918
UK MPs who were granted peerages
Politics of the Metropolitan Borough of Oldham
Members of the Parliament of the United Kingdom for constituencies in Lancashire
Barons created by George V